The Cebu Bus Rapid Transit System is a planned mass transit system for Cebu City, Philippines. It is expected to become the first operational bus rapid transit project in the Philippines. Only one line has been planned in detail so far, but scheme developers note the potential to develop a larger network comprising the adjacent cities of Lapu-Lapu, Mandaue, and Talisay, all of which, together with Cebu City, are part of the Cebu metropolitan area.

The project has faced numerous delays since its supposed implementation in 2016, from disagreements in the route alignments. The COVID-19 pandemic and Typhoon Rai (local name Odette) which hit Cebu also contributed to the delays in the project. However, the project finally broke ground on February 27, 2023. The Cebu BRT is expected to be fully operational by the second quarter of 2025, with partial operations eyed as early as the fourth quarter of 2023.

History and development

A bus rapid transit system for Cebu City was first proposed by former city mayor Tomas Osmeña in the 1990s, drawing inspiration from the Rede Integrada de Transporte in Curitiba, Brazil. However, it was only in 2008 when the Department of Transportation and Communications (DOTC) began formal planning. The World Bank is supporting the scheme financially and technically through its Clean Technology Fund.  The Philippine national government initially disapproved the project, but later it supported the project financially as then-Philippine President Benigno S. Aquino III placed it as a priority project to purse, through a public-private partnership. The former Mayor of Cebu City, Michael Rama, is also supportive of the plans and has formed two steering committees to advise on policies and provide technical expertise.  The Cebu City Team is headed by former Cebu City Councilor Nestor Archival, as the former Cebu BRT Project Development Officer, Engr. Nigel Paul Villarete, transferred to Mactan–Cebu International Airport on 26 October 2010.

A full feasibility study was commissioned by World Bank Integrated Transport Planning Ltd in September 2012. This study defined the infrastructure, stations, vehicles and operational plan as well as requirements for a citywide Area Traffic Control system and improvements to the urban realm. A large public consultation scheme was undertaken during this study which engaged directly with 5,000 Cebuanos as well as communication via newspapers, TV, radio and social media. After the feasibility study, areas affected by road right of way (RROW) or road widening were marked with varying measurements ranging from less than a meter to 13 meters. Those with BRT stations have larger RROWs. The RROW is also expected to displace many houses and establishments and remove more than 2,000 roadside trees.

The Cebu BRT was formally approved by the Philippine National Economic and Development Authority (NEDA) on May 29, 2014. The project was supposed to be funded by a 10.6 billion ($228.5-million) funding package, consisting of a World Bank loan of $116 million (6.4 billion), $25 million from the World Bank Clean Technology Fund, and €50.89 million from the French Development Agency, with the balance to be provided by the Philippine government. In 2017, the budget for the project was revised to 16.3 billion, in accordance to Republic Act 10752, also known as "The Right-of-Way Act", meant to give just compensation to lot owners affected by the project.

The Cebu Interim Bus Service (CIBUS) was launched in 2020 to provide a modern bus transport service to Cebu City, and was also aimed to mimic the Cebu BRT while it was still being formally planned and worked on. CIBUS runs largely the same route as the Cebu BRT, from South Road Properties to Cebu IT Park.

Following numerous delays since its supposed implementation in 2016, the Cebu BRT finally broke ground on February 27, 2023 in a ceremony attended by Philippine president Bongbong Marcos, Cebu City mayor Michael Rama, and Cebu governor Gwendolyn Garcia.

Route

The Cebu BRT route consists of a main line spanning  of segregated lanes with 17 stations, one depot, and one trunk terminal from South Road Properties southern Cebu City to the Cebu IT Park northern Cebu City. The main line will traverse several important thoroughfares of Cebu City, including Natalio Bacalso Avenue, Osmeña Boulevard, and N. Escario Street. A feeder line system with a total length of  will support the main line. The feeder lines will run over mixed traffic with priority for the buses, with two feeder terminals in Talisay and Talamban in northern Cebu City.

Upon completion, the Cebu BRT will traverse Cebu City and Talisay with a total of 76 bus stops across the system. There is also provision to extend the Cebu BRT system into the other cities and municipalities of the province of Cebu.

According to the Philippine Department of Transportation, the Cebu BRT can serve 60,000 passengers in a day for the first year of operations. Once the system is fully operational, the Cebu BRT system can cater a total of 160,000 passengers. For the first year of operation, 83 buses will ply the Cebu BRT routes, while a total of 144 buses will serve the system by 2038.

The original route for the Cebu BRT had  of segregated busways from Bulacao in southern Cebu City to Ayala Center Cebu, and a further  of bus priority at junctions to reach Talamban along Governor M. Cuenco Avenue. A spur line to the South Road Properties (SRP) was also part of the plan.

BRT terminal and stations
The design for the Cebu BRT stations is inspired by the sun and by flowers. It reflects the sunny disposition of Cebu, the bright and cheerful nature of our people and its festivals. Long lines are stressed and configured through the walls. BRT office chief Rafael Yap said the design is part of the initial input of the ongoing detailed engineering design for the project. Yap said the project's first phase covering the Osmeña Boulevard will be built next year since it is less burdened by road right of way concerns. The BRT station will be four meters wide and 83 meters long. The BRT first phase from Bulacao to Ayala will consist of 15 symmetric and asymmetric stations.

Branding
TransCebu is the proposed name for the BRT line. Single deck non-articulated buses which hold between 85 and 110 passengers will be used. A running speed of 25 km/hr is proposed with a peak frequency of 75 buses per hour on the core route. This operation is expected to carry 330,000 passengers each day.

Ticketing and fare collection
Fares will likely be collected through the use of prepaid smart cards. The pre-feasibility assessment for the BRT route states that if the fares were charged at the same level as jeepneys, ticket revenues could reach US$15 million per year, of which US$1.5 million is expected to be the profit or surplus.

Costs and benefits
The pre-feasibility study estimates that in comparison to using jeepneys the BRT route will save passengers 570 million hours of travelling per year and will also be cheaper for the bus operators as BRT vehicles are cheaper to run than the existing jeepneys. The overall cost benefit ratio has been evaluated to be 2.45.

If the buses were to run on diesel then the route is estimated to save 9,655 tonnes of PM10 emissions and 1.6 million tonnes of CO2 emissions up to the year 2035. However the DOTC is also considering running the vehicles on LPG, biofuel, hybrid or electricity which will reduce emissions further.

Expansion
The full BRT network for Metro Cebu could cover Talisay, Cebu City, Mandaue, and Lapu-Lapu City, the four largest cities of Metro Cebu. The Cebu BRT is also eyed to pass through the South Road Properties (SRP), and a direct connection to Mactan–Cebu International Airport (MCIA) is also a part of the plan in the near future. There could also be a BRT network at downtown Cebu specially at Colon Street.

Criticism
The narrow roads of Cebu City has been a point of criticism for the project. Arizona State University professor Donald Webster claimed that a BRT system in Cebu was not viable due to the city's narrow roads, suggesting instead that the project should be reimagined as a light rail or heavy rail system that could be built above or below the roads. This sentiment was also shared by Presidential Assistant for the Visayas Michael Diño, who stated that he would lobby to President Rodrigo Duterte to have the project scrapped in favor of a light rail transit system.

See also
EDSA Carousel

References

Sources

External links
 Bus Rapid Transit Planning Guide (available for download in pdf) Institute for Transportation & Development Policy
 Bus Rapid Transit, Volume 1: Case Studies in Bus Rapid Transit Transportation Research Board
 Bus Rapid Transit, Volume 2: Implementation Guidelines Transportation Research Board
 The National BRT Institute
 BRT Technologies: Assisting Drivers Operating Buses on Road Shoulders. University of Minnesota Center for Transportation Studies, Department of Mechanical Engineering (December 2003).
 Bus Rapid Transit Policy Center
 Institute for Transportation and Development Policy
 Across Latitudes and Cultures Bus Rapid Transit An international Centre of Excellence for BRT development
 Transit Capacity and Quality of Service Manual Transportation Research Board
 The Climate Investment Funds and the Clean Technology Fund

Transportation in Cebu
Cebu City
Bus rapid transit
Proposed public transportation in the Philippines